HIH may refer to:

 His or Her Imperial Highness, a title used for members of an imperial family
 HIH Insurance, a former Australian insurance company
 Harstad University College
 Heart in Hand (band), an English band
 Pamosu language's ISO code
 "Harleys in Hawaii", a song by Katy Perry, 2019